Billy Rex Lott (November 8, 1934May 15, 1995) was a professional American football running back who played in the National Football League (NFL) and the American Football League (AFL). He played for the NFL's New York Giants (1958) and the AFL's Oakland Raiders (1960) and Boston Patriots (1961–1963).

References

1934 births
1995 deaths
American football running backs
Boston Patriots players
New York Giants players
Oakland Raiders players
Ole Miss Rebels football players
People from Sumrall, Mississippi
Players of American football from Mississippi
American Football League players